Eletrobras Cepel, or Center for Energy Research (Cepel), is a State Funded electrical energy research institution located in Rio de Janeiro South America. It was founded in 1974 by Eletrobras and its subsidiaries: Chesf, Eletronorte, Eletrosul and Furnas. The Center's mission is to develop and deploy sustainable technology solutions for the generation, transmission and distribution of electricity by means of Research, Development and Innovation activities (R & D + I) for the Brazilian electricity sector.

Cepel has 30 laboratories, 20 of them are located in the headquarters in Rio de Janeiro city. The other ten labs are located in Nova Iguaçu (another city of Rio de Janeiro state), where works on high voltage, high current, etc. are developed.

Cepel is organized in five departments:

References

External links 

 

Eletrobras
Electric power in Brazil
Research institutes in Brazil
Companies based in Rio de Janeiro (city)
Energy companies established in 1974
1974 establishments in Brazil